Dell Lee Dailey (born 1949) is a retired United States Army lieutenant general and former head of the State Department's counterterrorism office, serving from July 2007 to April 2009.

Childhood and education
Dailey was born into an Army family in Flandreau, South Dakota. He received a Bachelor of Science degree from the United States Military Academy at West Point in 1971 and earned a master's degree in Public Administration from Shippensburg University in 1994.

Military career
Dailey served over 36 years on active duty in the United States Army, reaching the rank of lieutenant general. He participated in major military operations such as Desert Shield, Desert Storm, Uphold Democracy, Joint Guardian, Enduring Freedom and Iraqi Freedom.

After the September 11, 2001, attacks, Dailey directed the new Center for Special Operations, the military hub for all counterterrorism – United States Special Operations Command, at MacDill Air Force Base, Florida as well as running special operations in Afghanistan and Iraq.  From 2001 to 2003, he headed the Joint Special Operations Command, a United States Special Operations Command sub-unit.

State Department

Dailey was appointed the Department of State's Coordinator for Counterterrorism on June 22, 2007. In this role he had the title of Ambassador at Large and was charged with coordinating and supporting the development and implementation of U.S. Government policies and programs aimed at countering terrorism overseas. As the principal advisor to the Secretary of State on international counterterrorism matters, he was responsible for taking a leading role in developing coordinated strategies to defeat terrorists abroad and in securing the cooperation of international partners to that end.

Awards and honors
Dailey was inducted into the U.S. Army Ranger Hall of Fame in 2014.

Commendations

References

1949 births
Living people
People from Flandreau, South Dakota
United States Military Academy alumni
Military personnel from South Dakota
United States Army Rangers
United States Army personnel of the Gulf War
Recipients of the Air Medal
Shippensburg University of Pennsylvania alumni
Recipients of the Meritorious Service Medal (United States)
Recipients of the Legion of Merit
United States Army generals
Recipients of the Defense Superior Service Medal
United States Army personnel of the Iraq War
United States Department of State officials
United States Ambassadors-at-Large